Asiarcha is a genus of bugs in the family Tessaratomidae. There are three species known from South and Southeast Asia.

Species in the genus have a pronotal shield extending forward with parallel lateral margins; with the angles of the sixth abdominal segment acute and pointing backwards. They are very similar to the genus Mattiphus in which some species were formerly placed. Species in the genus include:
 Asiarcha angulosa Zia, 1957
 Asiarcha nigridorsis (Stål, 1863)
 Asiarcha oblonga (Dallas, 1851)

References

External links 
 Hemiptera database

Tessaratomidae
Heteroptera genera